Jaideep Ahlawat is an Indian actor who appears in Hindi films. He completed his graduation from Film and Television Institute of India (FTII), Pune in 2008. After completing his education, he headed Mumbai, to pursue his dreams to become an actor. He started his career in Bollywood with a small roles in films like  Aakrosh (2010) and the same year, he also starred in a satire comedy film called Khatta Meetha, wherein his negative role of a politician got appreciated in the film circles.

Though he appeared in smaller roles in Chittagong (2011) and Rockstar (2011), but went unnoticed till he got Gangs of Wasseypur (2012), wherein he plays the character called Shahid Khan. He played the villain in the Hindi movie Commando: A One Man Army that released in 2013.

Since then, Ahlawat has acted in films such as Aatma (2013), Gabbar is Back (2015) and Meeruthiya Gangsters (2015) Vishwaroopam 2. His character of RAW agent Mir in the Alia Bhatt-starrer Raazi (2018) was much appreciated. He got his widest recognition by playing Delhi Police Inspector Hathiram Chaudhary, the lead role in the Amazon Prime web series Paatal Lok (2020) in which he got first ever FILMFARE best actor male in Drama series. He also appeared in the Bollywood film Raees, produced by Shah Rukh Khan, he first rose to prominence in the role of Nawab (Musa's henchman) in Raees, Shahid Khan in Anurag Kashyap's Gangs of Wasseypur (2012) and as AK 74 in the movie Commando.

Early life and education

Jaideep was born in a jat family Kharkara,Meham  village in Rohtak district of Haryana state. He got his high school certificate from Govt. High School, Kharkara. He attended Jat College, Rohtak. After his graduation, Ahlawat did MA in English from Maharshi Dayanand University in 2005. He completed his acting graduation from FTII in 2008, actors like Rajkumar Rao, Vijay Verma, Sunny Hinduja were his  FTII  mates.

Career
Jaideep did theatre at a young age but wanted to be an Indian Army officer. However, after not clearing his SSB interviews, multiple times, he ventured into acting. He used to do stage shows in Punjab and Haryana. He started to take acting seriously only after his graduation. He entered the film-world the hard way, without any godfather. In 2008, Ahlawat came to Mumbai.
He was first noticed in a negative character in Priyadarshan's Khatta Meetha (2010). In the same year he appeared in Aakrosh with Ajay Devgn. Thereafter he did more films including Anurag Kashyap's Gangs of Wasseypur (2012) and Kamal Hasan's Vishwaroopam (2012).  Gangs of Wasseypur movie came as a turning point in Jaideep’s life, as its success, helped him gain enough recognition in India. Jaideep then appeared in a Tamil spy thriller film Vishwaroopam with Kamal Hassan, which turned a great success in the south in 2013. A Hindi version of this flick has been made called Vishwaroop in the same year, which gave him more recognition. Impressed by his acting skills & popularity, Kamal Hassan has roped him in the sequel Vishwaroopam 2 as well, that released in 2016. He was also seen in the series Bard of Blood.

He had played a negative character in Bollywood film, Khaali Peeli, which was released in October 2020.

Filmography

Films

Web series

Awards and nominations

References

External links
 
 

Indian male film actors
Living people
People from Rohtak district
Film and Television Institute of India alumni
Male actors in Hindi cinema
Male actors from Haryana
Maharshi Dayanand University alumni
Year of birth missing (living people)